Day of the Idiots is a 1981 West German psychological fantasy film drama directed and written by Werner Schroeter. It stars Carole Bouquet as a disturbed mental patient with an inclination to remove her clothes and Ingrid Caven as Dr. Laura and Christine Kaufmann as Ruth. 

The film was nominated for a Golden Palm Award at the 1982 Cannes Film Festival and won best film at the 1982 German Film Awards going to director Werner Schroeter.

Cast
Carole Bouquet as  Carole
Ingrid Caven as  Dr. Laura
Christine Kaufmann as  Ruth
Ida Di Benedetto as  Elisabet
Carola Regnier as  Ninon
Mostefa Djadjam as Alexander
Hermann Killmeyer as Markus
Marie-Luise Marjan as  Schwester Marjan
Magdalena Montezuma as  Zigeunerin
George Stamkoski as himself
Tamara Kafka
Dana Medřická
Fritz Schediwy
Jana Plichtová

References

External links

1981 films
1980s psychological films
1980s avant-garde and experimental films
German avant-garde and experimental films
West German films
1980s German-language films
Films directed by Werner Schroeter
Films set in psychiatric hospitals
German fantasy films
1980s German films